Danesh Moazed is a Professor of the Department of Cell Biology at Harvard Medical School and an investigator at Howard Hughes Medical Institute. He is known for unveiling the mechanism of the RNAi-mediated heterochromatin establishment. His lab currently works on chromatin biology and epigenetic inheritance.

Moazed received an undergraduate degree from the University of California at Santa Cruz. He continued his doctoral study at the University of California at Santa Cruz with Dr. Harry Noller on the function and structure of ribosomal RNA. He did his post-doctoral research at UCSF with Dr. Patrick H. O'Farrell and Dr. Sandy Johnson. In 1998, Dr. Danesh Moazed joined the faculty at the Harvard Medical School and became a Howard Hughes Medical Institute Investigator in 2008. In 2019, he was elected to American Academy of Arts and Sciences.

References 

Harvard Medical School faculty
Year of birth missing (living people)
Living people
American molecular biologists
American geneticists
Cell biologists
University of California, Santa Cruz alumni
Howard Hughes Medical Investigators